Toby's Bow is a 1919 American silent drama film directed by Harry Beaumont and starring Tom Moore, Doris Pawn, Macey Harlam, Arthur Housman, Colin Kenny, and Augustus Phillips. It is based on the 1919 play of the same name by John Taintor Foote. The film was released by Goldwyn Pictures on December 14, 1919.

Plot

Cast
Tom Moore as Tom Blake
Doris Pawn as Eugenia
Macey Harlam as Dubois
Arthur Housman as Bagby
Colin Kenny as Bainbridge
Augustus Phillips as Paige
Catherine Wallace as Valerie
Violet Schram as Mona
Ruby Lafayette as Grandmother
George Kuwa as Jap
Nick Cogley as Uncle Toby

Production
The role of the servant, Uncle Toby, was played by Nick Cogley in blackface.  The use of blackface was not unusual in American silent films, and did not disappear in films until the 1930s when public sensibilities regarding race began to change and blackface became increasingly associated with racism and bigotry.

Preservation
Toby's Bow is now considered to be a lost film.

References

External links

1919 drama films
Silent American drama films
1919 films
Lost American films
American silent feature films
American black-and-white films
Goldwyn Pictures films
American films based on plays
1919 lost films
Lost drama films
1910s American films